

Celypha aurofasciana is a small moth species of the family Tortricidae. It is native to Europe and the Palearctic but occurs in some other places as an introduced species.

Its wingspan is 12–14 mm. The face is white. The forewings are yellow, strigulated with dark fuscous and striated with leaden grey, more strongly posteriorly. The basal patch and central fascia are dark fuscous, the space between them forming a broad slightly curved pale striated fascia. There is a dark fuscous streak from the costa at 2/3 to the middle of the termen. The hindwings are dark grey. The larva is pale yellow; head black; plate of 2 reddish 

Adults are on wing from June to July.

The caterpillars feed in a silken gallery amongst mosses and liverwort on tree trunks. Recorded as food plants are mosses, but they have also been suspected to eat rotting wood.

Synonyms
Obsolete names (junior synonyms and others) of this species are:
 Celypha paleana Caradja, 1916
 Cymolomia latifasciana (Haworth, 1811)
 Grapholitha dormoyana Duponchel in Godart, 1835
 Loxoterma latifasciana var. paleana Caradja, 1916
 Olethreutes aurofascianus (lapsus)
 Tortrix aurofasciana Haworth, 1811
 Tortrix latifasciana Haworth, 1811 <ref>Tortrix latifasciana here refers to the species named by Haworth in Transactions of the Entomological Society of London in 1811. In the same year, he used the same name for Acleris laterana in  Lepidoptera Britannica.</ref>
 Tortrix venustana Frölich, 1828

Footnotes

References
  (2009): Online World Catalogue of the Tortricidae – Celypha aurofasciana. Version 1.3.1. Retrieved 2010-APR-19.
  (1942): Eigenartige Geschmacksrichtungen bei Kleinschmetterlingsraupen ["Strange tastes among micromoth caterpillars"]. Zeitschrift des Wiener Entomologen-Vereins 27: 105-109 [in German]. PDF fulltext
  (2005): Markku Savela's Lepidoptera and some other life forms – Celypha aurofasciana [sic'']. Version of 2005-SEP-14. Retrieved 2010-APR-19.

External links
 UK Moths

Olethreutini
Moths of Japan
Tortricidae of Europe